Musa Nuri Esfandiari  (born 1896 – death 1972) was an Iranian diplomat and served as foreign minister and as ambassador during the Pahlavi era. On 15 June 1948 he was appointed minister of foreign affairs to the cabinet led by Prime Minister Abdolhossein Hazhir. He was in office until November that year.

References

People of Pahlavi Iran
1896 births
Ambassadors of Iran to Iraq
Ambassadors of Iran to Germany
People from Nur, Iran
Foreign ministers of Iran
1972 deaths
20th-century Iranian diplomats